Minhaj as-Sunnah an-Nabawiyyah is a work by Ibn Taymiyyah. It was written as a refutation of a book by the Shi'a-Ithna'ashari theologian Al-Hilli called Minhaj al-karamah.

References

Sunni literature
Books by Ibn Taymiyyah